Cansolabao is one of the 21 barangays situated in the southeast portion of the Municipality of Hinabangan, Samar, Philippines. The barangay got its name from Cansolabao Creek. The waray word “canso” means creek and “labao” means beyond. The creek is the longest creek that crosses the barangay.  Cansolabao has a population of 1,267 with an annual budget of approximately 681,000.

History

Legendary account
A legendary account describes the arrival of three jungle hunters who were wandering in the wilderness. They traversed across Caliga-an River to hunt wild pigs. They had camped along the edge of the river when they weren't able to find a route to go back home. They settled there to harvest the forest's resources. The name became Sitio-Cansolabao under Barangay Bagacay in 1954–1969.

Modern history
The growth of Bagacay Mines helped support an increased population. The continuing population growth has conveyed politically Cansolabaonon to upsurge against bagacay governance. On August 18, 1969, the Cansolabao Improvement Organization (CIO) launched as temporary machinery for governance.

On January 21, 1970, Barangay Cansolabao was instituted as a separate barangay of the Municipality of Hinabangan in pursuant to Republic Act 3590, otherwise known as the Revised Barrio Charter, as enacted by the Provincial Board of Samar. It is classified as a 3rd class barangay.

Geography and climate
It is a frontier barangay approximately 30 Kilometers Southeast of Hinabangan town. The Philippine-Korean Highway passes through this barangay.

Cansolabao is visited by typhoons and rainfall throughout the year. The climate is suited for agricultural crops such as coconut, banana, pineapples, root crops and vegetables. It has a  forest awarded as the CBFM area. There are 2 other creeks, Haganap and Lungib. Aside from its forest it has coal, copper, aluminum, pyrite and gold deposits.

Economy
The most common occupation is the market, selling fish from nearby towns and homemade breads such as ira-ed, puto, suman, moron and hot cake. Subsistence farming feeds some residents, who grow copras, bananas, pineapples and cassava.

Cansolabao offers a barangay hall, basketball plaza, elementary school, dancing hall and rural health center.

School
Cansolabao Elementary School

References

Barangays of Samar (province)